Reineckea is a genus of plants in the Nolinoideae. Several species names have been proposed within the genus, but only one is widely accepted: Reineckea carnea, native to China and Japan.

Etymology
Reineckea is named for J. Reinecke, a German grower of tropical plants.

References

Nolinoideae
Monotypic Asparagaceae genera
Flora of China
Flora of Japan
Taxa named by Henry Cranke Andrews